This is a list of best-selling albums in Australia that have been certified by the Australian Recording Industry Association (ARIA). Since the 1970s, ARIA certified an album platinum for a shipment of 50,000 copies across Australia. In 1983, the number of copies required for a platinum album was raised to 70,000 copies. All albums in this list released after 1982 must have won at least ten ARIA Platinum Awards (700,000 copies) or fourteen awards (700,000 copies) if released before 1983. This list is primarily based on the ARIA database, so it does not include some of the albums which were best-sellers before ARIA began tracking records.

According to ARIA certifications, Bat Out of Hell by Meat Loaf is the best-selling album of all time in Australia with twenty-five times platinum, Whispering Jack by John Farnham is the second-best-selling album and best-selling album for any local artist with twenty-four times platinum, Shania Twain's Come On Over holds record for the best-selling album by a female solo artist with twenty-five times platinum. Gold: Greatest Hits by ABBA is the best-selling compilation album ever, while Madonna's The Immaculate Collection is the best-selling compilation album in solo artist category. All of these records (except for the second-best-selling album of all time) are held by foreign artists. The highest-selling album by an Australian female solo artist is Delta Goodrem's debut Innocent Eyes with fifteen times platinum.

Gold and Platinum certification awards (Timeline)

Albums

Best-selling albums in Australia

Listing is sorted by certified sales and by release year.

See also

 Australian Recording Industry Association
 Music of Australia
 List of best-selling singles in Australia
 List of best-selling albums by country

References

External links
ARIA Home Page

Australian music industry
Australia
Australian music-related lists